Battle of Changsha may refer to:

Battles
 Battle of Changsha (1852), part of the Taiping Rebellion
 Battle of Changsha (1911), part of the Xinhai Revolution
 Battle of Changsha (1939), in the Second Sino-Japanese War
 Battle of Changsha (1941), in the Second Sino-Japanese War
 Battle of Changsha (1941–1942), in the Second Sino-Japanese War
 Battle of Changsha (1944), in the Second Sino-Japanese War

Other uses
 Battle of Changsha (TV series), 2014